Maria Bogda (1909–1981) was a Polish actress.

Selected filmography
Pod banderą miłości (1929)
Głos pustyni (1932)
Bezimienni bohaterowie (1932)
Córka generała Pankratowa (1934)
Młody las (1934)
ABC miłości (1935)
Antek policmajster (1935)
Rapsodia Bałtyku (1935)
 Pan Twardowski (1936)
Kobiety nad przepaścią (1938)

References

External links

Polish film actresses
Polish silent film actresses
1909 births
1981 deaths
Burials at Rakowicki Cemetery
20th-century Polish actresses
Polish emigrants to the United States
Actors from Lviv
People from the Kingdom of Galicia and Lodomeria
Polish Austro-Hungarians